Girdner is an unincorporated community in Douglas County, in the U.S. state of Missouri. Girdner is located in central Douglas County, southeast of Ava, on Missouri Route P and the north side of Rippee Creek, a tributary of Bryant Creek.

History

A post office called Girdner was established in 1885, and remained in operation until 1942. The community  has the name of "Doc" Girdner, a pioneer citizen.

References

Unincorporated communities in Douglas County, Missouri
1885 establishments in Missouri
Unincorporated communities in Missouri